Sextus Empiricus was a Greek Pyrrhonist philosopher and Empiric school physician with Roman citizenship. His philosophical works are the most complete surviving account of ancient Greek and Roman Pyrrhonism, and because of the arguments they contain against the other Hellenistic philosophies, they are also a major source of information about those philosophies.

Life 
Little is known about Sextus Empiricus. He likely lived in Alexandria, Rome, or Athens. His Roman name, Sextus, implies he was a Roman citizen.The Suda, a 10th-century Byzantine encyclopedia, states that he was the same person as Sextus of Chaeronea, as do other pre-modern sources, but this identification is commonly doubted. In his medical work, as reflected by his name, tradition maintains that he belonged to the Empiric school in which Pyrrhonism was popular. However, at least twice in his writings, Sextus seems to place himself closer to the Methodic school.

Philosophy 

As a skeptic, Sextus Empiricus is raised concerns which applied to all types of knowledge. He doubted the validity of induction long before its best known critic David Hume, and raised the regress argument against all forms of reasoning:

This view is known as Pyrrhonian skepticism, which Sextus differentiated from Academic skepticism as practiced by Carneades which, according to Sextus, denies the possibility of knowledge altogether, something that Sextus criticized as being an affirmative belief. Instead, Sextus advocates simply giving up belief; in other words, suspending judgment (epoché) about whether or not anything is knowable. Only by suspending judgment can we attain a state of ataraxia (roughly, 'peace of mind'). 

There is some debate as to the extent to which Sextus advocated the suspension of judgement. According to Myles Burnyeat,  Jonathan Barnes, and Benson Mates, Sextus advises that we should suspend judgment about virtually all beliefs; that is to say, we should neither affirm any belief as true nor deny any belief as false, since we may live without any beliefs, acting by habit. Michael Frede, however, defends a different interpretation, according to which Sextus does allow beliefs, so long as they are not derived by reason, philosophy or speculation; a skeptic may, for example, accept common opinions in the skeptic's society. The important difference between the skeptic and the dogmatist is that the skeptic does not hold his beliefs as a result of rigorous philosophical investigation.

Writings 
Diogenes Laërtius and the Suda report that Sextus Empiricus wrote ten books on Pyrrhonism. The Suda also says Sextus wrote a book Ethica. Sextus Empiricus's three surviving works are the Outlines of Pyrrhonism (Pyrrhōneioi hypotypōseis, thus commonly abbreviated PH), and two distinct works preserved under the same title, Adversus Mathematicos (Pros mathematikous , commonly abbreviated "AM" and known as Against Those in the Disciplines, or Against the Mathematicians). Adversus Mathematicos is incomplete as the text references parts that are not in the surviving text. Adversus Mathematicos also includes mentions of three other works which did not survive: 
 Medical Commentaries (AD I 202) 
 Empirical Commentaries (AM I 62)
 Commentaries on the Soul which includes a discussion of the Pythagoreans' metaphysical theory of numbers (AD IV 284) and shows that the soul is nothing (AM VI 55)

The surviving first six books of Adversus Mathematicos are commonly known as Against the Professors. Each book also has a traditional title; although none of these titles except Pros mathematikous and Pyrrhōneioi hypotypōseis are found in the manuscripts. 

Adversus Mathematicos I–VI is sometimes distinguished from Adversus Mathematicos VII–XI by using another title, Against the Dogmatists (Pros dogmatikous) and then the remaining books are numbered as I–II, III–IV, and V, despite the fact that it is commonly inferred that what we have is just part of a larger work whose beginning is missing and it is unknown how much of the total work has been lost. The supposed general title of this partially lost work is Skeptical Treatises''' (/Skeptika Hypomnēmata).

 Legacy 
An influential Latin translation of Sextus's Outlines was published by Henricus Stephanus in Geneva in 1562, and this was followed by a complete Latin Sextus with Gentian Hervet as translator in 1569. Petrus and Jacobus Chouet published the Greek text for the first time in 1621. Stephanus did not publish it with his Latin translation either in 1562 or in 1569, nor was it published in the reprint of the latter in 1619.

Sextus's Outlines were widely read in Europe during the 16th, 17th and 18th centuries, and had a profound effect on Michel de Montaigne, David Hume and Georg Wilhelm Friedrich Hegel, among many others. Another source for the circulation of Sextus's ideas was Pierre Bayle's Dictionary. The legacy of Pyrrhonism is described in Richard Popkin's The History of Skepticism from Erasmus to Descartes and High Road to Pyrrhonism. The transmission of Sextus's manuscripts through antiquity and the Middle Ages is reconstructed by Luciano Floridi's Sextus Empiricus, The Recovery and Transmission of Pyrrhonism (Oxford: Oxford University Press, 2002). Since the Renaissance, French philosophy has been continuously influenced by Sextus: Montaigne in the 16th century, Descartes, Blaise Pascal, Pierre-Daniel Huet and François de La Mothe Le Vayer in the 17th century, many of the "Philosophes", and in recent times controversial figures such as Michel Onfray, in a direct line of filiation between Sextus' radical skepticism and secular or even radical atheism.

 Works 
 Translations 

Old complete translation in four volumes
 Sextus Empiricus, Sextus Empiricus I: Outlines of Pyrrhonism. R.G. Bury (trans.) (Cambridge, Massachusetts: Harvard University Press, 1933/2000). 
 Sextus Empiricus, Sextus Empiricus II: Against the Logicians. R.G. Bury (trans.) (Cambridge, Massachusetts: Harvard University Press, 1935/1997). 
 Sextus Empiricus, Sextus Empiricus III: Against the Physicists, Against the Ethicists. R.G. Bury (trans.) Cambridge, Massachusetts: Harvard University Press, 1936/1997. 
 Sextus Empiricus, Sextus Empiricus IV: Against the Professors. R.G. Bury (trans.) (Cambridge, Massachusetts: Harvard University Press, 1949/2000). 

New partial translations
 Sextus Empiricus, Against the Grammarians (Adversos Mathematicos I) David Blank (trans.) Oxford:  Clarendon Press, 1998. 
 Sextus Empiricus, Against those in the Disciplines (Adversos Mathematicos I-VI). Richard Bett (trans.) (New York: Oxford University Press 2018). 
 Sextus Empiricus, Against the Logicians. (Adversus Mathematicos VII and VIII). Richard Bett (trans.) Cambridge: Cambridge University Press, 2005. 
 Sextus Empiricus, Against the Physicists (Adversus Mathematicos IX and X). Richard Bett (trans.) Cambridge: Cambridge University Press, 2012. 
 Sextus Empiricus, Against the Ethicists (Adversus Mathematicos XI). Richard Bett (trans.) (Oxford: Clarendon Press, 2000). 
 Sextus Empiricus, Outlines of Scepticism. Julia Annas and Jonathan Barnes (trans.) (Cambridge: Cambridge University Press, 2nd ed. 2000). 
 Sextus Empiricus, The Skeptic Way: Sextus Empiricus's Outlines of Pyrrhonism. Benson Mates (trans.) Oxford: Oxford University Press, 1996. 
 Sextus Empiricus, Selections from the Major Writings on Skepticism Man and God. Sanford G. Etheridge (trans.) Indianapolis: Hackett, 1985. 

French translations
 Sextus Empiricus, Contre les Professeurs (the first six treatises), Greek text and French Translation, under the editorship of Pierre Pellegrin (Paris: Seuil-Points, 2002). 
 Sextus Empirucis, Esquisses Pyrrhoniennes, Greek text and French Translation, under the editorship of Pierre Pellegrin (Paris: Seuil-Points, 1997).

Old editions
 Sexti Empirici Adversus mathematicos, hoc est, adversus eos qui profitentur disciplinas, Gentiano Herveto Aurelio interprete, Parisiis, M. Javenem, 1569 (Vicifons).

 See also 
 Philosophical skepticism
 Protagoras
 Dissoi Logoi

 Notes 

 Bibliography 

 Annas, Julia and Barnes, Jonathan, The Modes of Scepticism: Ancient Texts and Modern Interpretations, Cambridge: Cambridge University Press, 1985. 
 Bailey, Alan, Sextus Empiricus and Pyrrhonean scepticism, Oxford: Oxford University Press, 2002. 

 Bett, Richard, Pyrrho, His Antecedents, and His Legacy, Oxford: Oxford University Press, 2000. 
 Breker, Christian, Einführender Kommentar zu Sextus Empiricus' "Grundriss der pyrrhonischen Skepsis", Mainz, 2011: electr. publication, University of Mainz. available online (comment on Sextus Empiricus’ “Outlines of Pyrrhonism" in German language)
 Brennan, Tad, Ethics and Epistemology in Sextus Empiricus, London: Garland, 1999. 
 Brochard, Victor, Les Sceptiques grecs (1887) reprint Paris: Librairie générale française, 2002.
 Burnyeat, Myles and Frede, Michael The Original Sceptics: A Controversy, Hackett: Indianapolis, 1997. 
 Floridi, Luciano, Sextus Empiricus: the Transmission and Recovery of Pyrrhonism, Oxford: Oxford University Press, 2002. 
 Hankinson, R.J., The Sceptics, London: Routledge, 1998. 
 Hookway, C., Scepticism, London: Routledge, 1992. 
 Jourdain, Charles, Sextus Empiricus et la philosophie scholastique, Paris: Paul Dupont, 1858.
 Janáček, Karel, Sexti Empirici indices, Firenze: Olschki, 2000.
 Janáček, Karel, Studien zu Sextus Empiricus, Diogenes Laertius und zur pyrrhonischen Skepsis. Hrsg. v. Jan Janda / Filip Karfík (= Beiträge zur Altertumskunde; Bd. 249), Berlin: de Gruyter 2008.
 Mates, Benson, The Skeptic Way: Sextus Empiricus's Outlines of Pyrrhonism, Oxford: Oxford University Press, 1996.
 Pappenheim Eugen, Lebensverhältnisse des Sextus Empiricus, Berlin, Nauck, 1875.
 Perin, Casey, The Demands of Reason: An Essay on Pyrrhonian Scepticism, Oxford: Oxford University Press, 2010.
 Popkin, Richard, The History of Scepticism: From Savonarola to Bayle, Oxford: Oxford University Press, 2003. 
 Vazquez, Daniel, Reason in Check: the Skepticism of Sextus Empiricus, Hermathena'', 186, 2009, pp. 43–57.

External links 

 Against the Mathematicians (at the Stoic Therapy eLibrary)
 
 Excerpts from the "Outlines of Pyrrhonism" by Sextus Empiricus
 
 Sextus Empiricus and Greek Scepticism (at Project Gutenberg; includes translation of first book of the Pyrrhonic Sketches)
 The complete works of Sextus Empiricus in Greek (at Google Books).
 Sexti Empirici opera recensuit Hermannus Mutschmann, voll. 2, Lipsiae in aedibus B. G. Teubneri, 1912.

2nd-century philosophers
Roman-era Skeptic philosophers
2nd-century Roman physicians
2nd-century Greek physicians
Ancient Greek epistemologists